The 2019 Aussie Racing Car Series was an Australian motor racing series for Aussie Racing Cars.

Entries

References

Aussie Racing Cars